An anspessade, or lanspessade, is a kind of French police officer that has been used in the foot soldiers, below the corporals, and yet above the common sentinels, between the 16th and 17th centuries.

There are usually four or five in each company. The term is formed of the Italian lancia spezzata ("broken lance"), used because they were originally disbanded gendarmes, horsemen in full armor, who for want of other subsistence sued for a place of some distinction in the infantry.

Military history of France
Military ranks of France
French Army